Mel Shapiro is an American theatre director and writer, college professor, and author.

Trained at Carnegie-Mellon University, Shapiro began his professional directing career at the Pittsburgh Playhouse and then as resident director at Arena Stage in Washington, D.C. He was co-producing director at the Guthrie Theater in Minneapolis and has worked as guest director at the Hartford Stage Company, the Center Theatre Group in Los Angeles (where he directed the American Premiere of Dario Fo's Accidental Death of an Anarchist), the National Playwright's Conference of the Eugene O'Neill Theater Center and the Stratford Shakespeare Festival in Canada.

Shapiro's off-Broadway productions include the original staging of John Guare's The House of Blue Leaves, which won the New York Drama Critics' Circle Award for Best American Play in 1971, and Rachel Owen's The Karl Marx Play for the American Place Theatre. London productions include the musicals Two Gentlemen of Verona and Kings and Clowns.

For Broadway, Shapiro co-wrote the book (with Guare) and directed the 1971 musical adaptation of Two Gentlemen of Verona and directed the 1978 revival of Stop the World - I Want to Get Off with Sammy Davis Jr. as well as John Guare's 1979 play Bosoms and Neglect. He has staged works at Lincoln Center, including Václav Havel's The Increased Difficulty of Concentration, which won an Obie Award for Best Foreign Play and Shakespeare's Richard III. His relationship with Joseph Papp spanned six years at the New York Shakespeare Festival Public Theater. Among his productions there are Guare's Rich and Famous, Marco Polo Sings a Solo, and John Ford Noonan's Older People.

Shapiro was one of the founding members of New York University's Tisch School of the Arts and served as the head of the Carnegie Mellon School of Drama. He was the head of graduate acting for the Theatre Department at the University of California, Los Angeles. He has taught and directed at the Queensland University of Technology's Theatre School in Brisbane, Australia, and  the National Institute of Dramatic Art in Sydney, Australia, in Fall, 2011. He has served on the boards of the Pittsburgh Public Theater, the Society of Stage Directors and Choreographers, and the Fund for New American Plays at the Kennedy Center and Theatre of Latin America.

Shapiro is the author of The Director's Companion and An Actor Performs.

Directing Credits
Among the actors worked with are:  Milton Berle, Sammy Davis, Jr., Raul Julia, Madeline Kahn, Christopher Walken, Stockard Channing, Jeff Goldblum, Linda Lavin, Joel Grey, Len Cariou, George Hearn, Billie Porter, Blair Underwood, James Wood, Patricia Routledge, Charles Ludlam, Allison Janney, Cloris Leachman, Anne Meara, Jerry Stiller and Rob Marshal

Among other authors worked with:  Isaac Bashevis Singer, Enemies, a Love Story; Dario Fo, Accidental Death of an Anarchist; Derek Walcott, The Charlatan.

Awards and nominations
1972 Tony Award for Best Book of a Musical (Two Gentlemen, winner)
1972 Tony Award for Best Musical, “Two Gentlemen”, winner
1972 Tony Award for Best Direction of a Musical (Two Gentlemen, nominee)
1972 Drama Desk Award for Outstanding Book of a Musical (Two Gentlemen, winner)
1972 Drama Desk Award for Outstanding Director of a Play (Older People, winner)
1972 Drama Desk Award for Outstanding Director of a Musical (Two Gentlemen, winner)
1994 Drama-logue award, playwriting, The Price of Admission
1999 Drama-logue award, direction, The Misanthrope
1998 Joseph Kesselring award, playwriting, The Lay of the Land

External links
 
 Playingwithshakespeare.com  
 Mel Shapiro | UCLA School of Theater, Film and Television

Year of birth missing (living people)
Living people
Carnegie Mellon University College of Fine Arts alumni
American theatre directors
American television directors
New York University faculty
American male writers
Tony Award winners